Kyle Trout (born 1 March 1991) is an English professional rugby league footballer who plays as a  for the Keighley Cougars in RFL Championship.

He played for the Wakefield Trinity Wildcats in the Super League, playing on loan from the Wildcats at Doncaster, Batley Bulldogs, Featherstone Rovers, Whitehaven and the Hunslet Hawks in the Kingstone Press Championship. He has also played for the Sheffield Eagles and the Dewsbury Rams in the Championship, and Hull Kingston Rovers in the Betfred Super League.

Background
Trout was born in Wigan, Greater Manchester, England. He is the older brother of the rugby league footballer; Owen Trout.

He played as a youth for Stanley Rangers.

In February 2021 he revealed he has autism and panic attacks.

Club career
On 5 August 2019, he signed a contract with Hull Kingston Rovers for the remainder of the season. Trout then went on to sign a further one-year contract with the Super League outfit, keeping him at the club until the end of the 2020 season.

Hull KR
Hull KR released Trout at the end of the 2020 season.

Limoux Grizzlies
On 7 January 2021, it was reported that he had signed for Limoux Grizzlies in the Elite One Championship.

Newcastle Thunder (loan)
On 10 June 2021, it was reported that he had signed for the Newcastle Thunder in the RFL Championship on loan.

Featherstone Rovers (Re-join)
On 1 December 2021, it was reported that he had signed for Featherstone in the RFL Championship.

Keighley Cougars
On 29 June 2022 it was reported that he had signed for Keighley Cougars in the RFL League 1.

References

External links
Hull KR profile
Stanley Rangers ARLFC - Roll of Honour
Profile at wakefieldwildcats.co.uk
SL profile

1991 births
Living people
Batley Bulldogs players
Dewsbury Rams players
Doncaster R.L.F.C. players
English rugby league players
Featherstone Rovers players
Hull Kingston Rovers players
Hunslet R.L.F.C. players
Keighley Cougars players
Limoux Grizzlies players
Newcastle Thunder players
Rugby league players from Wigan
Rugby league locks
Rugby league props
Sheffield Eagles players
Wakefield Trinity players
Whitehaven R.L.F.C. players